The Murree Rebellion of 1857 was a part of the Indian Rebellion of 1857. It was a skirmish between the hill tribes of Murree (in modern-day Pakistan) and the colonial government of British India. Resentment toward colonial rule had been mounting for many years following the establishment of British Raj in the subcontinent. There had been occasional isolated uprisings toward the British. The significance of the 1857 events was that, although not centrally coordinated, the uprisings had the feel of something much larger with real anticipation that colonial rule would be overthrown.

In the Murree Hills, the members of Karlal and Dhund Abbasi tribe rose up against the British.

Background
The tribes of Murree had risen against the British but not all had been against British rule. Before British rule had been established in the area, the tribes had fought against the Sikhs. Under the command of the Pir of Plasi Mohammed Ali Shah, they had fought against the Sikh Army in Balakot – the troops here were commanded by Shah Ismail Shaheed and Syed Ahmad Shaheed (known as "The Martyrs").

The Pir of Dewal, Son of General Sayed Shoodar Khan Mughal, had also died fighting in Dewal against the Sikh army chief Hari Singh Nalwa. He built a fort on the frontier of Punjab and NWFP in 1815, now called Aarhi or Hadd. Nalwa's troops had brutally crushed the tribes of Circle Bakote and beheaded many of them. He also sold the women of these tribes in Jammu central bazaar in 1834.

The British fought in Rawalpindi in 1845 and had captured Rani Jindan, the widow of Ranjit Singh; the latter the former Ruler of Punjab. This caused the collapse of Sikh rule and, when the British marched into the Murree area, the local tribes initially welcomed them. But many of the tribes soon realized that they had exchanged one form of occupation for another and events elsewhere in India also encouraged an uprising.

The British had recruited many of the tribes in the area into their army. For example, numerous members of the Satti Tribe were recruited as Sepoys and the British commanders (like elsewhere across Colonial India) won this war largely by the use of native infantry.

War Reaches Murree
The attack was led by Sherbaz Khan Abbasi. The masterminds of this plan of independence was Sardar Hasan Ali Khan Karlal & the two Syed brothers from Dhoke Syedan of Dewal Sharif. Sardar Hasan Ali Khan along with his tribe, and with the help of certain other tribes of Murree, tried to attack the Murree garrison. Immediately after the conclusion of the war of independence of 1857, the British Government constructed a road linking Galyiat and Muree and establish the five cantonments of Bara Gali, Nathia Gali, Dounga Gali, Changla Gali, and Kouza Gali and garrisoned them to protect any future incursion of on Muree Garrison.

Attack on Murree
By the end of August many of the British troops who had been stationed in hill stations like Murree had left to join the attack on Delhi. Rebels had taken Delhi from British control; the decision to send troops to Delhi reduced further Murree to a more defenseless state. However Delhi still held out against the British and was encouraged by this Dhund tribesmen in alliance with other tribes of Murree tried to seize Murree by simultaneously rising on every side and crowding up the nearer hill-sides threatening the destruction of the station. Several of the Mussulman table-servants were in league with the hill-men, and for some hours the danger to Murree became imminent.

The attack failed due to the fidelity of one of Lady Lawrence's personal attendants, named Hakim Abbasi, himself man of one of the tribes that had risen. The loyalty of Hakim was described as "the means, under God, of saving Murree." Alerted to the danger the British organized defenses, and quickly rallied volunteers commanded by Major Luard of the 55th N.I. and Captain HC Johnstone of the 5th N.I.
A cordon of sentries surrounded the station and the three weakest points were held in some force; so the Dhoonds (the distinctive name of these disaffected hillmen), stealing up the hill-sides in the dead of night found the whole station waiting for them.

After a few hours of skirmishing, the tribesmen retreated with the loss of two or three of their men who had come within musket range of the British. The British however were to learn that the rebellion was wider than just the local tribesmen. It was later found that the conspiracy affected many more clans to a much wider extent than had been suspected. It had reached far into Hazara and nearly down to Rawalpindi.

The British also convicted and executed two Hindustani doctors for being involved in the plot. They had been educated in government institutions, were practicing in Murree, and were employed by the government. The British suspected that the tribesmen were expecting support from their Hindustani allies, so in addition to the doctors, several domestic servants were seized and punished. An urgent request was sent to troops in Hazara to reinforce Murree, and Major Beecher sent every available man from Abbottabad to Murree.  However, the British troops in Murree had managed to secure the station and beat off the attack before the arrival of reinforcements arrived.

Although the British had managed to repulse the attack on Murree town, two neighboring heights were held by the tribesmen. The British in Murree were unable to send men to tackle the tribesmen in the hills as these were needed for the defense. For the whole of 2 September 1857 the heights around Murree were held by the tribesmen. It was not until 3 September with the arrival of reinforcements that the tribesmen were repulsed from the hills.

The reinforcements themselves were almost ambushed. They had to cross difficult country full or morasses and defiles. The tribesmen belonging from various tribes of Murree who had scattered into the forest laid an ambush to cut them off; However, the road on which the trap was laid became impassable from the rains. The force turned off, and not until it had passed the ambush spot.

Murree was garrisoned with extra troops and supplies of food; the British then burnt the rebellious villages, confiscated cattle and men were seized.

Aftermath
The rebels were betrayed and punishment laid; Sardar Sherbaz Khan Abbasi's eight sons were blasted by cannon fire in Murree and Sardar Sherbaz Khan Abbasi was hanged until death.

See also
Rai Ahmad Khan Kharal

References

Murree
Murree
Rawalpindi District
Murree